La Tele was a Venezuelan television channel. It may also refer to:

Latele, a Paraguayan channel
La Tele (show), a Colombian comedy television show originally produced by Carlos Vives
La Tele (Peru), a peruvian  television network operated by Grupo ATV
La Tele (Ecuador), a ecuatorian channel television network